Stanley Kebenei (born November 6, 1989) is a Kenyan-American distance runner who ran for Iowa Central Community College and the University of Arkansas.

Career

Iowa Central (2011–13)
Stanley Kebenei earned nine NJCAA national championship titles at Iowa Central Community College.

University of Arkansas
In 2014, Stanley Kebenei became the most recent senior in Arkansas history to earn all American honor at the NCAA National Cross Country Championships.

Stanley Kebenei earned six NCAA Division 1 Track and Field All-American honors and two NCAA Division 1 cross country awards.

Professional
Stanley Kebenei is a professional runner for Nike, Inc.

Kebenei won in 44:37 in the 2016 USATF 15 km championships in Jacksonville, Florida. Interview after 2016 USATF 15 km championship victory

Kebenei placed second in steeplechase at 2016 Payton Jordan Invitational in 8:22.85.  Kebenei placed fifth in steeplechase at 2016 Diamond League Golden Gala in Rome in 8:18.52. As of June 3, 2016, Kebenei is ranked in the United States and twenty-sixth in the world going into the Trials.

References

External links

arkansasrazorbacks.com profile

Living people
1989 births
American male long-distance runners
Kenyan male long-distance runners
American male steeplechase runners
Arkansas Razorbacks men's track and field athletes
World Athletics Championships athletes for the United States
Iowa Central Community College alumni